Paul S. Seale (born March 29, 1939) is a former Canadian football player who played for the BC Lions. He won the Grey Cup with them in 1964. He played college football at the Oregon State University. He is a member of the Wenatchee Valley College & BC Sports Halls of Fame.

References

1939 births
BC Lions players
Oregon State Beavers football players
Place of birth missing (living people)
Living people